Air26 - Linhas Aéreas, S.A. was an airline based in Luanda, Angola. Founded in 2006, it operates domestic passenger and cargo flights out of the city's Quatro de Fevereiro Airport. Along with all other Angolan airlines except for TAAG, Air 26 is banned from operating within the European Union. In 2010, the company had its licence revoked, but it was re-issued on 31 January 2011. The airline was unable to fully re-start by the end of the year, however.

Fleet 

The Air 26 fleet consisted of the following aircraft (as of August 2019):

Former fleet
The airline previously operated the following aircraft:
1 further Embraer EMB 120

References

External links

Defunct airlines of Angola
Airlines established in 2006
Airlines disestablished in 2011
Companies based in Luanda